Calliostoma jackelynae is a species of sea snail, a marine gastropod mollusk in the family Calliostomatidae.

Some authors place this taxon in the subgenus Calliostoma (Fautor).

Distribution
This marine species occurs off the Philippines.

References

 Bozzetti, L., 1997. Study of the collection of Mr. Emmanuel Guillot de Suduiraut with the descriptions of three new gastropod species (Fasciolariidae, Trochidae and Turridae). Bulletin of the Institute of Malacology, Tokyo 3(4):55-58, pls. 19, 20

External links

jackelynae
Gastropods described in 1997